The WTA Christchurch (also known by its corporate title of the Colgate International) is a defunct WTA Tour affiliated tennis tournament played in 1970–71 and 1978. It was held in Christchurch, New Zealand and was played on outdoor grass courts.

The 1970 and 1971 editions were only exhibition events and were not part of the professional tours of 1970 and 1971. It was not held again until 1978, when it became a professional tournament on the WTA Tour and offered a total of US$35,000 in prize money. The event has been cancelled since.

Results

Singles

Doubles

References 
 ITF results archive

 
Christchurch
Grass court tennis tournaments
Tennis tournaments in New Zealand
Sport in Christchurch
Defunct tennis tournaments in Oceania
Defunct sports competitions in New Zealand